Ust-Kivda is a rural locality (a selo) in Malinovsky Selsoviet of Bureysky District, Amur Oblast, Russia. The population was 156 as of 2018. There are 6 streets.

Geography 
Ust-Kivda is located near the right bank of the Bureya River, 24 km southwest of Novobureysky (the district's administrative centre) by road. Novospassk is the nearest rural locality.

References 

Rural localities in Bureysky District